The Toquaht Nation is a modern treaty government located on the west coast of Vancouver Island in British Columbia, Canada.  It is a member of the Maa-nulth Treaty Society and the Nuu-chah-nulth Tribal Council.

Introduction 

In terms of citizenship, the Toquaht Nation is one of the smallest First Nations within the Nuu-chah-nulth Tribal Council (NTC). The Nation has about 150 citizens in total. There are roughly 20 people currently living at the main village of Macoah, which is accessible off Highway 4 on Kennedy Lake. Most remaining citizens live in Ucluelet, Port Alberni, Nanaimo and Victoria.   

Despite its small size the Toquaht Nation has, within the NTC and the Central Region First Nations,  engaged in active political leadership, business initiatives, cultural events, and been a proponent of the Maa-nulth First Nations Final Agreement.  On April 1, 2011, the Maa-nulth First Nations Final Agreement was implemented, the second treaty to be implemented under the BC treaty process.

Governance 

Historically, the Toquaht Nation, like many Nuu-chah-nulth Nations, maintained a hereditary system of governance. Under the Maa-nulth First Nations Final Agreement, however, Toquaht moved towards a "hybrid" hereditary/elected system, which maintains traditional governance approaches.  This hybrid model has two hereditary leaders holding permanent seats on Council, with three other Councillors  elected every four years.  The government structure under the Toquaht Constitution consists of a Legislative branch, an Executive branch, and a People’s Assembly. The Toquaht Nation reserves the right to establish a judicial branch as well.

In January 2009, in a traditional ceremony Grand Chief Bert Mack passed on Chieftainship to Anne Mack, who succeeds him after a reign of over 50 years.

Administration 

The Toquaht Nation has a small administrative structure which oversees social and economic development programs, treaty implementation, and governance coordination.

Business and Economic Development 

The Toquaht Nation and its citizens manage or own businesses including:
 Barkley Sound Shellfish L.P.
 Toquaht Bay Marina and Campground L.P.
 Toquaht Development L.P. (sawmill)
 Toquaht Enterprises L.P. (forestry)
 Toquaht Management L.P. (asset management)

Toquaht Lands 

The implementation of the Maa-nulth First Nations Final Agreement freed the Toquaht Nation from the Indian Act and re-established self-governance and control over Toquaht traditional territories.  Under the Maa-nulth treaty, Toquaht regained control of 1,489 hectares of land with an option to purchase 721 more hectares over 15 years.  This was a significant increase to the 199 hectares of Indian Reserve lands that were held in trust for the Toquaht Nation under the Indian Act.

Sources 

Ecotrust Canada. Jackie Godfrey, "The Toquaht Nation," in Daniel Arbour, Brenda Kuecks & Danielle Edwards (editors).  Nuu-chah-nulth Central Region First Nations Governance Structures 2007/2008, Vancouver, September 2008.

See also

Nuu-chah-nulth people
Nuu-chah-nulth language

External links
Nuu-chah-nulth Tribal Council homepage
Toquaht Nation

Nuu-chah-nulth governments
Barkley Sound region